Tim Worstall (born 27 March 1963, Torquay) is a British-born writer and blogger and Senior Fellow of the Adam Smith Institute.  He writes on the subjects of environmentalism and economics, particularly corporate tax, his contributions having appeared in the business press. In 2010 his blog was listed as one of the top 100 UK political blogs by Total Politics.

Early life

Worstall was educated at the London School of Economics. He worked in the Soviet Union, and became a trader in rare elements such as scandium and zirconium.

Career
Worstall is a regular contributor to CapX. He has also written for The Guardian, The New York Times, PandoDaily, Forbes, The Register, The Daily Telegraph blogs, The Times, and The Wall Street Journal. In 2010 his blog was listed as one of the top 100 UK political blogs by Total Politics.

Worstall is a supporter of the UK Independence Party (UKIP), stood as a candidate for London in the European Parliament election, 2009, and acted as the party's press officer.

Worstall's writings on economics and environmentalism have received a varied response.  Matt Ridley described his book Chasing Rainbows as "Fearless, fresh, forensic and funny", while in response to an article by Worstall about the think tank Compass the author Colin Hines described Worstall's argument as "a libellous smokescreen". Worstall has also written on corporate tax and has been critical of the protest group UK Uncut.

In 2018 Tim founded the news site The Continental Telegraph reporting on news and current events.

Bibliography

References

External links
 Tim Worstall's blog

1963 births
Living people
English bloggers
English book editors
English expatriates in Portugal
People educated at Downside School
Writers from Torquay
English male non-fiction writers
21st-century English writers
British male bloggers